Doggett may refer to :

Places
6363 Doggett (1981 CB1), a main-belt asteroid discovered in 1981
Doggetts Fork, Virginia, an unincorporated community in the US state of Virginia

People
Bill Doggett (1916–1996), US jazz and rhythm and blues pianist and organist
David Seth Doggett (1810-1880), US Bishop of the Methodist Episcopal Church
Derrick Doggett (born 1984), Canadian professional football player
Jerry Doggett (1916–1997), US sports broadcaster
John Doget (died 1501), English diplomat, scholar and Renaissance humanist.
John Doggett (columnist) (f. 1990s-present), US political commentator
John Doggett (politician) (1723-1772), Nova Scotia political figure
Lloyd Doggett (born 1946), US politician from Texas
Marjorie Doggett (1921-2010), animal rights activist in Singapore
Ruth Doggett (1881–1974), English artist
Samuel Doggett (1871-1935), American jockey
Thomas Doggett (ca. 1640–1721), Irish actor

Other uses
Doggett v. United States, a 1992 case that was decided by the US Supreme Court
Doggett's Coat and Badge, the oldest rowing race in the world
Doggett's Repository of Arts, a Boston (Massachusetts, USA) art gallery c.1821-1825, run by John Doggett
John Doggett, fictional character in the Canadian-American FOX television series The X-Files
Tiffany Doggett, a fictional character in the Netflix TV series Orange is the New Black